The Humboldt University of Berlin (abbreviated HU Berlin) is a public research university in the central borough of Mitte in Berlin, Germany

The university was established by Frederick William III on the initiative of Wilhelm von Humboldt, Johann Gottlieb Fichte and Friedrich Ernst Daniel Schleiermacher as the University of Berlin in 1809, and opened in 1810, making it the oldest of Berlin's four universities. From 1828 until its closure in 1945, it was named Friedrich Wilhelm University. During the Cold War, the university found itself in East Berlin and was de facto split in two when the Free University of Berlin opened in West Berlin. The university received its current name in honour of Alexander and Wilhelm von Humboldt in 1949.

The university is divided into nine faculties including its medical school shared with the Freie Universität Berlin. The university has a student enrollment of around 32,000 students, and offers degree programs in some 189 disciplines from undergraduate to post-doctorate level. Its main campus is located on the  boulevard in central Berlin. The university is known worldwide for pioneering the Humboldtian model of higher education, which has strongly influenced other European and Western universities.

It was regarded as the world's preeminent university for the natural sciences during the 19th and early 20th century, as the university is linked to major breakthroughs in physics and other sciences by its professors, such as Albert Einstein. Past and present faculty and notable alumni include 57 Nobel Prize laureates (the most of any German university by a substantial margin), as well as eminent philosophers, sociologists, artists, lawyers, politicians, mathematicians, scientists, and heads of state; among them are: Albert Einstein, Hermann von Helmholtz, Emil du Bois-Reymond, Robert Koch, Theodor Mommsen, Karl Marx, Friedrich Engels, Otto von Bismarck, W. E. B. Du Bois, Angela Davis, Arthur Schopenhauer, Georg Wilhelm Friedrich Hegel, Walter Benjamin, Max Weber, Georg Simmel, Karl Liebknecht, Ernst Cassirer, Heinrich Heine, Eduard Fraenkel, Max Planck and the Brothers Grimm.

As one of Germany's most prestigious institutions of higher education, Humboldt-Universität zu Berlin has been conferred the title of "University of Excellence" under the German Universities Excellence Initiative.

History

Main building
The main building of Humboldt-Universität is the Prinz-Heinrich-Palais (English: Prince Henry's Palace) on Unter den Linden boulevard in the historic centre of Berlin. It was erected from 1748 to 1753 for Prince Henry of Prussia, the brother of Frederick the Great, according to plans by Johann Boumann in Baroque style. In 1809, the former Royal Prussian residence was converted into a university building. Damaged during the Allied bombing in World War II, it was rebuilt from 1949 to 1962.

In 1967, eight statues from the destroyed Potsdam City Palace were placed on the side wings of the university building. Currently there is discussion about returning the statues to the Potsdam City Palace, which was rebuilt as the Landtag of Brandenburg in 2013.

Early history

The University of Berlin was established on 16 August 1809, on the initiative of the liberal Prussian educational politician Wilhelm von Humboldt by King Friedrich Wilhelm III, similar to University of Bonn, during the period of the Prussian Reform Movement. The university was located in a palace constructed from 1748 to 1766 for the late Prince Henry, the younger brother of Frederick the Great. After his widow and her ninety-member staff moved out, the first unofficial lectures were given in the building in the winter of 1809. Humboldt faced great resistance to his ideas as he set up the university. He submitted his resignation to the King in April 1810, and was not present when the school opened that fall. The first students were admitted on 6 October 1810, and the first semester started on 10 October 1810, with 256 students and 52 lecturers in faculties of law, medicine, theology and philosophy under rector Theodor Schmalz. The university celebrates 15 October 1810 as the date of its opening. In 1810, at the time of the opening, the university established the first academic chair in the field of history in the world. From 1828 to 1945, the school was named the Friedrich Wilhelm University, in honor of its founder. Ludwig Feuerbach, then one of the students, made a comment on the university in 1826: "There is no question here of drinking, duelling and pleasant communal outings; in no other university can you find such a passion for work, such an interest for things that are not petty student intrigues, such an inclination for the sciences, such calm and such silence. Compared to this temple of work, the other universities appear like public houses."

The university has been home to many of Germany's greatest thinkers of the past two centuries, among them the subjective idealist philosopher Johann Gottlieb Fichte, the theologian Friedrich Schleiermacher, the absolute idealist philosopher G.W.F. Hegel, the Romantic legal theorist Friedrich Carl von Savigny, the anti-optimist philosopher Arthur Schopenhauer, the objective idealist philosopher Friedrich Schelling, cultural critic Walter Benjamin, and famous physicists Albert Einstein and Max Planck.

The founders of Marxist theory Karl Marx and Friedrich Engels attended the university, as did poet Heinrich Heine, novelist Alfred Döblin, founder of structuralism Ferdinand de Saussure, German unifier Otto von Bismarck, Communist Party of Germany founder Karl Liebknecht, African American Pan Africanist W. E. B. Du Bois and European unifier Robert Schuman, as well as the influential surgeon Johann Friedrich Dieffenbach in the early half of the 1800s.

The structure of German research-intensive universities served as a model for institutions like Johns Hopkins University. Further, it has been claimed that "the 'Humboldtian' university became a model for the rest of Europe [...] with its central principle being the union of teaching and research in the work of the individual scholar or scientist."

Enlargement

In addition to the strong anchoring of traditional subjects, such as science, law, philosophy, history, theology and medicine, the university developed to encompass numerous new scientific disciplines. Alexander von Humboldt, brother of the founder William, promoted the new learning. The construction of modern research facilities in the second half of the 19th century aided the teaching of the natural sciences. Famous researchers, such as the chemist August Wilhelm Hofmann, the physicist Hermann von Helmholtz, the mathematicians Ernst Eduard Kummer, Leopold Kronecker, Karl Weierstrass, the physicians Johannes Peter Müller, Emil du Bois-Reymond, Albrecht von Graefe, Rudolf Virchow, and Robert Koch, contributed to Berlin University's scientific fame.

During this period of enlargement, the university gradually expanded to incorporate other previously separate colleges in Berlin. An example would be the Charité, the Pépinière and the Collegium Medico-chirurgicum. In 1710, King Friedrich I had built a quarantine house for Plague at the city gates, which in 1727 was rechristened by the "soldier king" Friedrich Wilhelm: "Es soll das Haus die Charité heißen" (It will be called Charité [French for charity]). By 1829 the site became the Friedrich Wilhelm University's medical campus and remained so until 1927 when the more modern University Hospital was constructed.

The university started a natural history collection in 1810, which by 1889, required a separate building and became the Museum für Naturkunde. The preexisting Tierarznei School, founded in 1790 and absorbed by the university, in 1934 formed the basis of the Veterinary Medicine Facility (Grundstock der Veterinärmedizinischen Fakultät). Also the Landwirtschaftliche Hochschule Berlin (Agricultural University of Berlin), founded in 1881 was affiliated with the Agricultural Faculties of the university.

In August 1870, in a speech delivered on the eve of war with France, Emil du Bois-Reymond proclaimed that "the University of Berlin, quartered opposite the King's palace, is, by the deed of our foundation, the intellectual bodyguard of the House of Hohenzollern (das geistige Leibregiment des Hauses Hohenzollern)."

Third Reich

After 1933, like all German universities, Friedrich Wilhelm University was affected by the Nazi regime. The rector during this period was Eugen Fischer. It was from the university's library that some 20,000 books by "degenerates" and opponents of the regime were taken to be burned on 10 May of that year in the Opernplatz (now the Bebelplatz) for a demonstration protected by the SA that also featured a speech by Joseph Goebbels. A monument to this can now be found in the center of the square, consisting of a glass panel opening onto an underground white room with empty shelf space for 20,000 volumes and a plaque, bearing an epigraph from an 1820 work by Heinrich Heine: "Das war ein Vorspiel nur, dort wo man Bücher verbrennt, verbrennt man am Ende auch Menschen" ("This was but a prelude; where they burn books, they ultimately burn people").

The Law for the Restoration of the Professional Civil Service (German "Gesetz zur Wiederherstellung des Berufsbeamtentums") resulted in 250 Jewish professors and employees being fired from Friedrich Wilhelm University during 1933–1934 and numerous doctorates being withdrawn. Students and scholars and political opponents of Nazis were ejected from the university and often deported. During this time nearly one third of all of the staff were fired by the Nazis.

Cold War

 
During the Cold War, the university was located in East Berlin. It reopened in 1946 as the University of Berlin, but faced repression from the Soviet Military Administration in Germany, including the persecution of liberal and social democrat students. Almost immediately, the Soviet occupiers started persecuting non-communists and suppressing academic freedom at the university, requiring lectures to be submitted for approval by Socialist Unity Party officials, and piped Soviet propaganda into the cafeteria. This led to strong protests within the student body and faculty. NKVD secret police arrested a number of students in March 1947 as a response. The Soviet Military Tribunal in Berlin-Lichtenberg ruled the students were involved in the formation of a "resistance movement at the University of Berlin", as well as espionage, and were sentenced to 25 years of forced labor. From 1945 to 1948, 18 other students and teachers were arrested or abducted, many gone for weeks, and some taken to the Soviet Union and executed. Many of the students targeted by Soviet persecution were active in the liberal or social democratic resistance against the Soviet-imposed communist "dictatorship"; the German communist party had regarded the social democrats as their main enemies since the early days of the Weimar Republic. During the Berlin Blockade, the Freie Universität Berlin was established as a de facto western successor in West Berlin in 1948, with support from the United States, and retaining traditions and faculty members of the old Friedrich Wilhelm University. The name of the Free University refers to West Berlin's perceived status as part of the Western "free world," in contrast to the "unfree" Communist world in general and the "unfree" communist-controlled university in East Berlin in particular.

Since the historical name, Friedrich Wilhelm University, had monarchic origins, the school was officially renamed in 1949. Although the Soviet occupational authorities preferred to name the school after a communist leader, university leaders were able to name it the Humboldt-Universität zu Berlin, after the two Humboldt brothers, a name that was also uncontroversial in the west and capitalized on the fame of the Humboldt name, which is associated with the Humboldtian model of higher education.

Modern Germany

After the German reunification, the university was radically restructured under the Structure and Appointment Commissions, which were presided by West German professors. For departments on social sciences and humanities, the faculty was subjected to a "liquidation" process, in which contracts of employees were terminated and positions were made open to new academics, mainly West Germans. Older professors were offered early retirement. The East German higher education system included a much larger number of permanent assistant professors, lecturers and other middle level academic positions. After reunification, these positions were abolished or converted to temporary posts for consistency with the West German system. As a result, only 10% of the mid-level academics in Humboldt-Universität still had a position in 1998. Through the transformations, the university's research and exchange links with Eastern European institutions were maintained and stabilized.

Today, Humboldt University is a state university with a large number of students (36,986 in 2014, among them more than 4,662 foreign students) after the model of West German universities, and like its counterpart the Freie Universität Berlin.

The university consists of three different campuses, namely Campus Mitte, Campus Nord and Campus Adlershof. Its main building is located in the centre of Berlin at the boulevard Unter den Linden and is the heart of Campus Mitte. The building was erected on order by King Frederick II for his younger brother Prince Henry of Prussia. All the institutes of humanities are located around the main building together with the Department of Law and the Department of Business and Economics. Campus Nord is located north of the main building close to Berlin Hauptbahnhof and is the home of the life science departments including the university medical center Charité. The natural sciences, together with computer science and mathematics, are located at Campus Adlershof in the south-east of Berlin. Furthermore, the university continues its tradition of a book sale at the university gates facing Bebelplatz.

Organization

The aforementioned nine faculties into which the university is divided:
 Faculty of Law
 Faculty of Mathematics and Natural Sciences (Geography, Computer Science, Mathematics, Chemistry, Physics)
 Faculty of Life Sciences (Agriculture and Horticulture, Biology, Psychology)
 Charité – Berlin University of Medicine (jointly with Free University of Berlin)
 Faculty of Philosophy I (Philosophy, History, European Ethnology, Department of Library and Information Science)
 Faculty of Philosophy II (Literature, Linguistics, Scandinavian Studies, Romance literatures, English and American Studies, Slavic Studies, Classical Philology)
 Faculty of Humanities and Social Sciences (Social Sciences, Cultural Studies/Arts, Asian/African Studies (includes Archeology), Sport science, Rehabilitation Studies, Education, Quality Management in Education)
 Faculty of Theology
 Faculty of Economics and Business Administration

Furthermore, there are two independent institutes (Zentralinstitute) that are part of the university:
 Centre for British Studies (in German: Großbritannienzentrum)
 Humboldt-Innovation (research transfer and spin-off service)
 Museum für Naturkunde (Natural History Museum)
 Späth-Arboretum

Student representation
|-
! colspan="2" style="text-align:left;" | Lists
! Votes
! %
! ±
! Seats
! ±
|-
| style="background-color:#BB0301;" |
| style="text-align:left;" | Juso-Hochschulgruppe
| 252
| 
| 
| 13
| +4
|-
| style="background-color:#FC3ABE;" |
| style="text-align:left;" | OLKS – OffeneListeKritischerStudierender
| 180
| 
| 
| 9
| +3
|-
| style="background-color:#C62B29;" |
| style="text-align:left;" | Linke Liste an der HU – LiLi
| 156
| 
| 
| 8
| 0
|-
| style="background-color:#0C4EAE;" |
| style="text-align:left;" |  – Demokratisch. Praktisch. Gut.
| 151
| 
| 
| 8
| +4
|-
| style="background-color:#578724;" |
| style="text-align:left;" | Grünboldt
| 115
| 
| 
| 6
| +2
|-
| style="background-color:none" |
| style="text-align:left;" | Queer-feministische LGBT*I*Q*-Liste
| 114
| 
| 
| 6
| +3
|-
| style="background-color:#C40049;" |
| style="text-align:left;" | Die Linke.SDS HU Berlin
| 88
| 
| 
| 4
| +2
|-
| style="background-color:#ED1C24;" |
| style="text-align:left;" | IYSSE
| 63
| 
| 
| 3
| +1
|-
| style="background-color:#000000;" |
| style="text-align:left;" | João & the autonome alkis.Die LISTE
| 53
| 
| 
| 3
| +2
|-
! colspan="2" style="text-align:left;" | Total
! 1172
! style="text-align:center;" colspan="2"| 100%
! style="text-align:center;" colspan="2"| 60
|}

Library

When the Royal Library proved insufficient, a new library was founded in 1831, first located in several temporary sites. In 1871–1874 a library building was constructed, following the design of architect Paul Emanuel Spieker. In 1910 the collection was relocated to the building of the Berlin State Library.

During the Weimar Period the library contained 831,934 volumes (1930) and was thus one of the leading university libraries in Germany at that time.

During the Nazi book burnings in 1933, no volumes from the university library were destroyed. The loss through World War II was comparatively small. In 2003, natural science-related books were outhoused to the newly founded library at the Adlershof campus, which is dedicated solely to the natural sciences.

Since the premises of the State Library had to be cleared in 2005, a new library building was erected close to the main building in the center of Berlin. The "Jacob und Wilhelm Grimm-Zentrum" (Jacob and Wilhelm Grimm Centre, Grimm Zentrum, or GZ as referred to by students) opened in 2009.

In total, the university library contains about 6.5 million volumes and 9,000 held magazines and journals, and is one of the biggest university libraries in Germany.

The books of the Institut für Sexualwissenschaft were destroyed during the Nazi book burnings, and the institute destroyed. Under the terms of the Magnus Hirschfeld Foundation, the government had agreed to continue the work of the institute at the university after its founder's death. However, these terms were ignored. In 2001, the university acquired the Archive for Sexology from the Robert Koch Institute, which was founded with a large private library donated by Erwin J. Haeberle. This has now been housed at the new Magnus Hirschfeld Center.

Academics

Rankings 
Measured by the number of top managers in the German economy, Humboldt-Universität ranked 53rd in 2019.

In 2020 the British QS World University Rankings rankedHumboldt-Universität 117th overall in the world and 4th best in Germany. Its global subject rankings were: 15th in Arts & Humanities, 13th in Philosophy and 7th in Classics & Ancient History.

The British Times Higher Education World University Ranking 2019 listed Humboldt-Universität as the 67th best university in the world, 20th best in the Arts & Humanities, and  4th best in Germany.

In 2020, the American U.S. News & World Report listed Humboldt-Universität as the 82nd best in the world, climbing eight positions, being among the 100 best in the world in 17 areas out of 29 ranked.

International partnerships 
HU students can study abroad for a semester or a year at partner institutions such as the University of Warwick, Princeton University, and the University of Vienna.

Notable alumni and faculty

See also
 History of European universities
 Friedrich Althoff
 List of split up universities

References

Further reading

External links 

  

 
Educational institutions established in 1810
Universities and colleges in Berlin
Rebuilt buildings and structures in Berlin
1810 establishments in Prussia
Universities established in the 19th century
Alexander von Humboldt